Avenues The World School is an international system of for-profit private schools for toddler-12th grade. The first campus opened in September 2012 in New York City in the neighborhood of Chelsea. The system offers a shared, curriculum, technology, professional development of faculty and oversight by a centralized headquarters.

History
Avenues was founded by Benno C. Schmidt, Jr., former President of Yale University, Chris Whittle, an entrepreneur in media and education who had previously founded Edison Schools, and Alan Greenberg, who had been publisher of Esquire. In 2015 Whittle left Avenues and would later found Whittle School & Studios.

Prior to opening its New York campus in 2012, the company raised $85 million dollars. The New York campus opened after a $60-million renovation of a building originally designed by Cass Gilbert. The school opened with 12 of its planned 15 grades for the 2012–2013 school year, including all grades between nursery and ninth grade. The 10th, 11th and 12th grades were added over the subsequent three years. Avenues' first graduating class was in spring 2016. The school was unusual among New York City private schools in offering a binding early admission option.

Avenues and several students from the school were heavily featured in the 2015 documentary film Class Divide, which explores the topic of gentrification.

Campuses

See also

 Education in New York City
 List of high schools in New York City

References
Notes

Further reading
"Starting local, going global: 'Avenues: The World School' debuts grand plan" in Gay City News
"LLR Partners invests in Avenues: The World School" in the Philadelphia Business Journal
"Has Avenues Mastermind Chris Whittle Learned His Lesson?" in The New York Observer

External links
 

2011 establishments in New York City
Chelsea, Manhattan
Educational institutions established in 2011
International schools in the United States
International schools in New York City
Private elementary schools in Manhattan
Private high schools in Manhattan
Private middle schools in Manhattan
For profit schools in Manhattan